The 1994–95 season was the 60th season in existence for Real Zaragoza competed in La Liga for 17th consecutive year, Copa del Rey and UEFA Cup Winners' Cup for the first time since the 1986–87 edition.

Summary
During Summer the club kept its core line-up delivering a decent performance in League with the team competing over European spots including a massive record of 18 months undefeated at La Romareda. During winter Presidente Solans reinforced the team with Brazilian Right-back Cafu a 1994 FIFA World Cup winner. In Copa del Rey as incumbent Champions the squad was early eliminated by underdogs Albacete Balompie in Eightfinals. However, the season is best remembered by the club participation in UEFA Cup Winners' Cup, after defeated Feyenoord in Quarterfinals, the team eliminated Chelsea F.C. in semifinals and reaching the 1995 UEFA Cup Winners' Cup Final for the first time ever.

Finally, the club won in Paris its first European trophy defeating incumbent Champions and heavy-favourites Arsenal F.C. with a last minute goal scored by former Tottenham Hotspur midfielder Nayim at Parc des Princes.

Squad

Transfers

Winter

Competitions

Supercopa

La Liga

League table

Position by round

Matches

Copa del Rey

Eightfinals

UEFA Cup Winners' Cup

Round of 32

Eightfinals

Quarter-finals

Semifinals

Final

Statistics

Players statistics

See also
  BDFutbol

References

Real Zaragoza
Real Zaragoza seasons
UEFA Cup Winners' Cup-winning seasons